Fnatic (pronounced "fanatic"; also stylised as fnatic or FNATIC) is a professional esports organisation headquartered in London, United Kingdom. Founded on 23 July 2004, the team has players from around the world, across a variety of games, such as Apex Legends, Counter-Strike: Global Offensive, Dota 2, FIFA, Heroes of the Storm, League of Legends, Valorant, and Rainbow Six Siege.

Fnatic's League of Legends team won the first-ever League of Legends World Championship in 2011, and also held the record for the most League of Legends Championship Series split titles in the LEC—totalling seven of the 19 played so far—until G2 Esports won their eighth title in the 2020 LEC Summer Split. With the 2015 EU LCS Summer Split they became the first LCS team to finish a split undefeated.

Fnatic's CS:GO team, which has traditionally been located in Sweden, won the first ever CS:GO Major in 2013 and two more between 2013 and 2015. After a series of poor results dating back to the start of 2021, Fnatic made a move towards an international roster for the first time since 2013.

The organisation has claimed more than 200 championship victories across 30 different games since its inception in 2004. According to Forbes, Fnatic is now worth $260 million in 2022 and is among the top 10 most valuable esports companies.

History 
The organisation was founded on 23 July 2004 by Sam Mathews and Anne Mathews. After playing several years for Fnatic, Patrik "cArn" Sättermon, a Counter-Strike player, became the chief gaming officer of Fnatic in 2012. Wouter Sleijffers replaced Anne Mathews as CEO in 2015, whilst Sam Mathews is the board chairman.

Between 2008 and 2009, Fnatic was sponsored by MSI and SteelSeries, spurring a temporary name change to FnaticMSI. On 1 June 2011, Fnatic partnered with EIZO to launch their gaming monitors into the market.

In 2006, Fnatic acquired a World of Warcraft team, Fnatic. WoW. Returning to represent Fnatic in the World of Warcraft 3v3 community was players TooGood, Vo0, and Ztrider. The Fnatic. WoW division won top finishes in events including BlizzCon, Intel Extreme Masters (IEM) and Major League Gaming (MLG).

In 2007, Fnatic acquired a DotA team, Fnatic. DotA, represented by Ritter "Ritter" Rusli, Romi "melen" Gunawan, Ariyanto "Lakuci" Sony, Sugiarto "BaHaMuT" Cahyadi, Jeffry "Neo" Lu. They were formerly known as XcN DotA.

In 2008, Fnatic picked up a new DotA team with a roster of Edvin "Kwom" Börjesson, Jonathan "Loda" Berg, Rasmus "Misery" Berth, Rene "Kebap-" Werner, and Aringazin "Aidar" Aidar.

In 2010 FnaticMSI.HoN was restructured with a roster of Johan "N0tail" Sundstein, Kalle "Trixi" Saarinen, Henrik "Freshpro" Hansen, Jascha "Nova" Markuse, and Tal "Fly" Aizik.

In January 2012, Fnatic took on RaidCall as a sponsor. With the new title sponsor, Fnatic expanded into South Korea and became the first non-Korean esports team to acquire a professional gaming house in Seoul.

In 2012, Fnatic picked up the former GamersLeague Dota 2 team in order to compete with other top teams. The team placed fourth in ESWC, but soon after, the team parted ways with Fnatic.

In August 2014, Fnatic announced that it had partnered with Luke Millanta to produce a number of Counter Strike: Global Offensive weapon finishes.

In 2015, Fnatic announced a return to Dota 2, acquiring and sponsoring Team Malaysia.

On 1 October 2015 sports betting website Dafabet became a sponsor of Fnatic.

On 23 March 2017, Fnatic announced that it would be making a one-off return to Heroes of Newerth with an all-Swedish roster made up of Makke, iNsaniA, Xibbe, Boxi and miCKe, and it would compete at the HonTour Season 5 World Finals in Bangkok. On 2 April 2017, Fnatic became the champions of HonTour Season 5, defeating [MiXs] Phoenix MiXs on the grand finals.

On 6 October 2017, Fnatic joined the competitive Rocket League scene after acquiring the former roster of Leftovers.

On 12 April 2018, Fnatic joined the competitive Rainbow Six Siege scene after acquiring the former roster of Mindfreak.

The company has its headquarters in London, near the Silicon Roundabout at Old Street, with a full-time senior management team including a CEO, CGO, Sales Director, Accounts Director and Head of Creative Services.

Fnatic also runs an independent digital agency, Sannpa, for businesses looking to be involved in esports.

In April 2019, Fnatic raised $19M in Series A funding round and restructured its leadership as it plans a major expansion in Asia and North America.

In October 2019, Fnatic acquired Indian PUBG Mobile team Xspark, consisting of Sc0utOP, Ronak, Paritosh, Owais and InYoDream. Fnatic disbanded the team in March 2021.

In November 2019, Fnatic announced it had entered into a partnership with Japanese company Sanrio to collaborate on content and merchandise around its Hello Kitty brand.

In October 2020, Fnatic announced a multi-year global partnership with Chinese-based global consumer electronics and home appliances market leader, Hisense. The same year Fnatic signed a multi-year partnership with BMW.

In March 2021, Fnatic announced a renewal of partnership with a global online gaming entertainment service "LeTou" and would serve as official sponsors for their DOTA 2 squad.

In November 2022, Fnatic launched its own music label, Fnatic Music. The announcement coincided with the album Fnatic Island Vol. 1.

Current divisions

Counter-Strike

Counter-Strike: Source and 1.6 
Fnatic entered the Counter-Strike competitive scene in 2004, when the team was founded by Freek "FraK" Tammelling. The initial roster, led by Benjamin "diGitaL" Hildén, managed to win CPL Singapore 2005 but struggled to make much of an impact at other international events. At the beginning of 2006, Fnatic released the entire line-up except for sniper Harley "dsn" Örwall, who was tasked to assemble a new roster. Örwall recruited Patrik "cArn" Sättermon, the in-game leader of Eyeballers; Oscar "Archi" Torgersen, from Team GoN; and Begrip duo Patrik "f0rest" Lindberg and Kristoffer "Tentpole" Nordlund. This line-up would go on to win many major events in 2006, culminating with a 1st-place finish at CPL Winter 2006. In 2011, Fnatic's Counter-Strike team placed top three in many events with their newly acquired player, Michael "Friis" Jørgensen. This simultaneously led to dropping many uncontracted players such as Qet (Counter-Strike), Lauke (UT) and Vo0 (Q3).

cArn gained a reputation as one of Counter-Strike's premier in-game leaders and strategy callers from 2006 to 2012 due to his ability to lead several completely different Fnatic rosters to major tournament wins. However, in March 2012, he announced his surprise retirement before the IEM Season VI World Finals, going on to become the first chief gaming officer for Fnatic. Xizt took on the role of the in-game leader, replacing cArn with Finn "karrigan" Andersen, another Danish player. The new team won their first major LAN event at Copenhagen Games 2012. On the same weekend, FnaticRC.aLive won his first ever major tournament at IPL4 Las Vegas.

After Fnatic won 2012 DreamHack Summer and the Swedish Championships, Rasmus "Gux" Stahl retired from Counter-Strike, leaving an open spot in Fnatic. On 26 June, Fnatic announced that Martin "trace" Heldt would join the team. In August, Richard "Xizt" Landstorm left the team to play CS:GO for NiP; Emil "FYRR73" Karlsson was announced as his replacement.

Counter-Strike: Global Offensive 
When Fnatic switched to Counter Strike: Global Offensive, they became one of the top teams in the world. In order to complete the roster, Fnatic announced that Xyp9x and JOKERN would join them to compete in Counter Strike: Global Offensive. The team was able to finish in the 3rd/4th position of the EMS Season 1 Finals.

In late 2013, Fnatic won the first ever major tournament in Counter Strike: Global Offensive, under the guidance of their new leader, Markus "pronax" Wallsten, taking out the team Ninjas in Pyjamas (NIP). In 2014, Fnatic took in 2 ex-LGB players, Olof "olofmeister" Kajbjer and Freddy "KRIMZ" Johansson. They went on to win ESL One Katowice 2015 after defeating NIP, and on 24 August 2015, Fnatic won ESL One Cologne 2015, after defeating Team EnVyUs. Because of this roster's back-to-back major wins and elven other international titles, some consider this Fnatic team to be the strongest roster ever assembled in the history of CS:GO.

In November 2015, after a few disappointing tournament performances, pronax decided to take a hiatus from competitive CS:GO. He was replaced with Dennis "dennis" Edman from international team G2 Esports. In December 2015, Fnatic beat NIP 2–1 and secured their second Fragbite Masters win, the other being in season 3. Fnatic regained the #1 position in HLTV's team rankings after the tournament, and remained the #1 ranked team in the world until 18 April 2016.

In April 2016 olofmeister suffered a wrist injury, and John "wenton" Eriksson took his place temporarily.

On 15 August 2016 Fnatic announced that Robin "flusha" Rönnquist, Jesper "JW" Wecksell, and KRIMZ would be transferred to GODSENT and the team would be welcoming Simon "twist" Eliasson and Jonas "Lekr0" Olofsson in return. Wenton, who was already a substitute for Fnatic, completed the line-up.

On 20 August 2017 Fnatic announced that olofmeister would depart from Fnatic to join FaZe Clan, and dennis would also leave Fnatic and join GODSENT; they were replaced by Maikil "Golden" Selim and Lekr0.

In September 2019, flusha and Golden, two previous squad members, rejoined the team. Following this roster move, Fnatic enjoyed some success, until at the start of 2021 there were more changes, with flusha stepping down from the team's active roster, to be replaced by the 21 year old talent Jack "Jackinho" Ström Mattsson. after this change, the team had a slew of losses, falling over the next six months to a near all-time low of position #65 on the HLTV team ranking. As a result of this, the decision was made to change things up, with the roster becoming, for the first time, an international one following the addition of UK players Alexander "ALEX" McMeekin and William "mezii" Merriman and the benching of JW and Golden.

This change was positive at first for Fnatic, leading to good performances at ESL Pro League XIV, and allowed them to regain a spot amongst the top 20 HLTV teams; however, following a bad performance at IEM Fall 2021, where they failed to win a single match, Fnatic failed to qualify for the 2021 Stockholm Major, and shortly afterward, Jackinho was benched from the team. Owen "smooya" Butterfield was signed to replace Jackinho on a 3-month trial. The addition of smooya marked the first time in the history of Fnatic fielded a British majority line-up. After poor results at Katowice 2022 in February, smooya was benched and replaced by the Romanian sniper Iulian "⁠regali⁠" Harjău, shortly before qualification for the PGL Major Antwerp 2022.

In March 2022, Brollan who had been with Fnatic since 2018 and during that time made the HLTV top 20 players twice, was transferred to NIP. Valentin "⁠poizon⁠" Vasilev and Peppe "⁠Peppzor⁠" Borak were added to the roster to replace smooya and Brollan, although poizon only on trial and Peppzor temporarily moved up from the academy team. After not achieving desired results, ALEX and poizon were benched and Peppzor was returned to the Fnatic Rising academy team, leaving only KRIMZ and mezii in the team.

In an attempt to better results, the Danish duo Nico "⁠nicoodoz⁠" Tamjidi and Fredrik "⁠roeJ⁠" Jørgensen were transferred from Copenhagen Flames to Fnatic, in June. In August, to complete the roster the Dutch rifler Dion "⁠FASHR⁠" Derksen was added to the roster. Furthermore, mezii took the position of in-game leader after it was left vacant after the departure of ALEX.

After three years of not attending a Major, with the last being the IEM Katowice Major 2019 where Fnatic finished 12–14th in the Challengers Stage, they managed to qualify for the IEM Rio Major 2022 Challengers Stage.

Current roster

Dota 2 
On 30 March 2012, Fnatic's Heroes of Newerth team, consisting of Johan "N0tail" Sundstein, Jascha "NoVa" Markuse, Tal "Fly" Aizik, and Adrian "Era" Kryeziu officially switched to Dota 2. By early September of the same year, a roster was finalised with the addition of Kai "H4nn1" Hanbückers and Kalle "Trixi" Saarinen, the latter of whom replaced Jascha "NoVa" Markuse.

In 2014, Fnatic parted ways with its Dota 2 squad with each member deciding to leave the organisation.

In 2015, Fnatic announced a return to Dota 2, acquiring the roster of Team Malaysia.

Fnatic placed 4th at The International 2016.

Current roster

FIFA 
In 2008, Fnatic picked up Maximo12, a Spanish FIFA football video game player who won several titles in 2008 & 2009, such as the WCG Spain Champion in 2008.

On 6 November 2019, Fnatic signed Tekkz.

League of Legends

Season 1 
Fnatic entered the League of Legends scene in March 2011 by acquiring the roster of the esports team myRevenge. Two months later, the squad consisting of xPeke, LaMiaZeaLoT, Shushei, CyanideFI, Mellisan and MagicFingers qualified for the Season 1 World Championship after WetDream left. Fnatic performed well during the championship and after taking down against All authority 2–1 they were crowned the Season 1 world champions.

Season 2 
In Season 2 and the preseason before it, the team participated in the Intel Extreme Masters Season VI circuit and Azubu The Champions Spring 2012, where they reached the quarter finals. After that, the team lost many of its players. Between June and September 2012, Shuhei, Mellisan, Pheilox, and Lamia moved on and were replaced by sOAZ, and nRated. Among these roster changes the team did not manage to qualify for the Season 2 World Championship after losing the deciding series in the Regional Finals with 0–2 against Counter Logic Gaming EU.

Season 3 
In the Season 3 preseason, Rekkles joined the team and Fnatic won DreamHack Winter 2012, finished second at IPL 5 in Las Vegas and IEM Season VII – Global Challenge Cologne.

Rekkles did not meet the minimal age requirements for Riot's Season 3 League Championship Series and was replaced by YellOwStaR on 26 December.

In 2013, Fnatic won the Spring Split of Season 3, but during the Summer Split, the team struggled and decided that a player change was necessary. In July 2013, Fnatic announced changes to their League of Legends roster. nRated, the main support, left the team and YellOwstaR, the former AD carry, switched roles to play support. Puszu then joined the team in their Cologne gaming house to finish Season 3 as Fnatic's AD Carry. Fnatic later won the Season 3 Summer Split and qualified for the World Championship in Los Angeles, California.

During the Group Stage of the Season 3 World finals, Fnatic went into the quarter-finals against Cloud9, considered the best team in North America at the time. After defeating Cloud9 2–1, Fnatic advanced to the semi-finals against Royal Club Huang Zu. They later lost against Royal Club and placed tied for third place.

Season 4 
In the 2014 season, Rekkles rejoined the team and Fnatic secured their third LCS title after defeating SK Gaming in the playoffs final of the Spring Split. The Summer Split saw Fnatic struggle against Alliance in another playoffs final but even after losing the match, Fnatic had collected enough points to qualify for the 2014 World Championship.

The World Championship saw Fnatic placed in Group C with Korea's Samsung Blue, China's OMG, and North America's LMQ. The team was only able to win 2 out of 6 matches, meaning that they would go no further in the tournament.

Season 5 

In the 2015 preseason, sOAZ, Rekkles, xPeke and Cyanide left Fnatic and were replaced by Huni, Reignover, Febiven, and Steeelback.

Fnatic won the 2015 Spring Split, after beating the Unicorns of Love on 19 April 2015 in Madrid, Spain in the playoffs grand final that went 3–2 in favour of Fnatic. They would later attend the Mid-Seasonal Invitational, an international competition attended by the top teams of each region. They went 2–3 in the group stage and made it to the playoffs. They were matched against former world champion SK Telecom T1, to whom they lost 2–3.

In the 2015 EU LCS Summer Split, Fnatic became the first LCS team to complete a regular split undefeated, finishing with a score of 18 wins and 0 losses. They would go on to win the 2015 EU Summer Split Playoffs, beating Origen 3–2, and qualifying for the 2015 League of Legends World Championship as the first seed from Europe.

In the 2015 League of Legends World Championship, Fnatic took first place Group B in the group stage with a 4–2 record. In the quarterfinals they defeated the Chinese team EDward Gaming with a score of 3–0. In the semifinal, they lost to the Korean team KOO Tigers with a score of 0–3, giving them a third/fourth-place finish in the tournament.

Season 6 

The 2016 preseason saw the departure of Huni, Reignover and Yellowstar from the team. It was then announced that they would be replaced by Spirit, Gamsu and NoxiaK, respectively.

In the 2016 Spring Split the team struggled to find its footing at first but the replacement of NoxiaK by Klaj saw an improved Fnatic make it to the final of the Intel Extreme Masters Katowice where they lost 0–3 against SKT T1. The team finished the split in sixth place and made it to the playoffs where they upset Team Vitality 3–1 before losing to eventual champions G2 Esports 3–1 in the semifinals. They then defeated H2k Gaming 3–2 to secure third place overall.

A month later, Fnatic announced the return of Yellowstar to the line-up for the 2016 Spring Split.

On 13 May 2016, Fnatic announced the departure of Gamsu from the starting line-up. He was replaced by former G2 Esports top laner Mateusz "Kikis" Szkudlarek. Kikis debuted with Fnatic during the start of the 8th week of the EU LCS. Fnatic finished the 2016 EU LCS Summer Split regular season in 4th after a playoff match against H2k-Gaming. They would go on to play H2k again in the playoffs. In between the two fixtures, Fnatic parted ways with head coach Luis "Deilor" Sevilla and replaced him with Nicholas "NicoThePico" Korsgård. After their series against H2k was delayed due to technical issues, H2k defeated Fnatic 3–0 on 16 August 2016.

Season 7 
In 2017, Fnatic took 3rd place in both 2017 EU LCS season splits.

Season 8 
After acquiring Zdravets "Hylissang" Galabov for the Support role during the off-season, the new Fnatic roster, now also featuring Mads "Broxah" Brock-Pedersen as the starting Jungler, saw immediate improvements to their performance, and would go on to win both the 2018 EU LCS spring title, as well as the 2018 LEC summer title, (The league rebranded halfway through the year) overcoming their rivals G2 Esports in spring, and Schalke 04 in summer.

During MSI 2018 the team managed to make it past the group stage after a tie-breaker against the LCS champions, Team Liquid, but would be defeated in the playoffs after being clean swept by the LPL representatives and eventual tournament winners Royal Never Give Up, who at the time were widely considered to be the best team in the world.

During the 2018 EU LCS Summer Split the team, in a very controversial decision, would be forced to bench Rekkles and promote their top lane substitute Gabriël "Bwipo" Rau to the starting position after new meta developments left marksmen heavily unfavorable across all levels of play, though the former would eventually return after the meta changes were partially reverted by Riot.

During Worlds 2018 Fnatic would made it through the Group Stage only losing once to the China's Invictus Gaming as well as losing the tiebreaker, and advance to the Playoffs Stage, where the team would successfully defeat China's Edward Gaming, 3–1, and clean sweep North America's Cloud9 in the semifinals match. After these victories Fnatic would reach the World Championship Finals, the first time since 2011, and the second time ever for any western team, where they would meet their Group Stage competitors Invictus Gaming again. IG would dominate them in every game and clean sweep the Fnatic to win the 2018 World Championship.

Season 9 
In the 2019 LEC spring split, Fnatic finished in 3rd place. In the summer split they reached the final, where playing against G2 Esports they were already leading 2–0 at one point, but finally lost 2–3. 
They played the 2019 League of Legends World Championship as 2nd seed from Europe, where they reached the quarter-finals, losing 1–3 against FunPlus Phoenix.

Season 10 
In 2020, Fnatic reached the final in both the spring and summer LEC splits. In them, they lost 0–3 twice to the G2 Esports team.
At the 2020 League of Legends World Championship, just like the year before, Fnatic reached the quarter-finals. They lost there against Chinese Top Esports, at one point leading 2–0, but finally losing 2–3 after an exciting match.

Season 11 
In 2021, Fnatic lost their biggest star Martin Rekkles Larsson, who moved to G2 Esports at the end of his contract. In his place, Upset entered the squad.
With him in the squad, Fnatic did not do too well in the 2021 LEC spring split, in which they only finished 5th, losing 0–3 against Schalke 04 Esports in the play-offs.
In the summer split, Fnatic played much better and reached the final, where they lost 1–3 against MAD Lions, finishing in 2nd place.
At the 2021 League of Legends World Championship Fnatic did not show very well. They crashed out in the group stage. Finishing with a score of 1–5.

Season 12 
In 2022 Fnatic finished 3rd in both the spring and summer 2022 LEC splits. In the spring they lost in the semifinals 0–3 against G2 Esports. and for the summer they lost in the semifinals 1–3 against Rogue.
At 2022 League of Legends World Championship they went through the play-ins. In the group phase, they started promisingly by winning their first two games against Cloud9 and T1, but lost their remaining 4. Thus finishing the group phase with a score of 2–4 and did not advance to the next phase of the competition.

Season 13 
Fnatic made two line-up changes for the 2023 LEC season. After five years, support Zdravets "Hylissang" Iliev Galaboc left the team. Ruben "Rhuckz" Barbosa was brought in from Fnatic's academy team in his place. Meanwhile, in the ADC position, Elias "Upset" Ger was replaced by Martin "Rekkles" Larsson, who returned to the organisation after two years.

After a poor result in the LEC 2023 winter split, where they finished 9th, Fnatic decided to make changes again. Oscarinin and Advienne replaced Wunder and rhuckz, while Nightshare became the new head coach.

Honours

Domestic 
 LEC
 Winners (7): 2013 Spring, 2013 Summer, 2014 Spring, 2015 Spring, 2015 Summer, 2018 Spring, 2018 Summer

International 
 World Championship
 Winners (1): 2011

Current roster

Rainbow Six Siege 
On 12 April 2018, Fnatic signed their first Tom Clancy's Rainbow Six Siege team just days before the Season 7 APAC (Asia Pacific) Finals where they placed first, beating Japanese rivals, PET Nora-Rengo. Fnatic acquired the former Australian roster of Mindfreak. The original roster consisted of Matthew "Acez" McHenry, Jason "Lusty" Chen, Etienne "Magnet" Rousseau, Daniel "NeophyteR" An, Ethan "RizRaz" Wombwell, and Jayden "Dizzle" Saunders as coach.

On 19 May 2018, Fnatic went out in the quarter finals of the Season 7 Finals losing to eventual champions Team Liquid. On 17 November 2018, Fnatic unexpectedly beat top North American team, Evil Geniuses 2–0 in a stunning upset in the Season 8 Finals. The following day, Fnatic fell to G2 Esports without winning a single round in either of the played maps, losing 6–0, 6–0, and placing 3–4th in the event.

On 30 November 2018, Fnatic signed Jake "Virtue" Grannan as a sixth player after having their coach, Dizzle, substitute for Magnet after he contracted appendicitis, leaving Fnatic a man down in the Season 8 Finals, where they surprisingly upset against Evil Geniuses. Virtue officially replaced NeophyteR after the latter left in early March 2019 after having Virtue play for him on many events since his signing. On 12 March 2019, Fnatic signed Ryan "Speca" Ausden as a sixth player after Virtue filled NeophyteR's spot. On 19 May 2019, Fnatic placed 3–4th in the Season 9 Finals after beating their rivals, PET Nora-Rengo in the quarter finals but losing to eventual champions Team Empire. Fnatic placed 13–16th in the Six Major Raleigh 2019, falling to both DarkZero Esports and FaZe Clan without taking a single map. At the Season 10 APAC Finals, Singaporean Aerowolf upset against Fnatic, winning 2–1 and stopping Fnatic from qualifying to the Season 10 Finals and possibly prevented them from reaching the Six Invitational 2020.

After a disappointing result at the Season 10 APAC Finals, RizRaz and Speca both left, with the former retiring from competitive Rainbow Six Siege. They were replaced by Tex "Tex" Thompson from fellow Australian Pro League team, Team Sinister, and the only notable Chinese player in Rainbow Six Siege, Patrick "MentalistC" Fan from Aerowolf. At the Six Invitational 2020, Fnatic stunned all by making it out of the "Group of Death" which contained Team Empire, DarkZero, and FaZe Clan, who were all considered to be the top of their regions. Fnatic later defeated reigning two-time world champions, G2, before falling to BDS Esport. After the Six Invitational, Virtue was acquired by G2 making the first ever APAC to EU transfer in Rainbow Six competitive history. Acez was returned to the main roster to replace Virtue after he was previously moved to a substitute rule.

Current roster

Valorant
In February 2021, Fnatic entered Valorant by acquiring the SUMN FC roster. Following mixed results, the organisation signed MAGNUM and Derke leading up to the VCT Stage 2 Challengers 2 event, replacing Moe40 and tsack. The roster finished first following a 3–1 victory against Team Liquid, but lost 2–3 to the same team in the VCT EMEA Stage 2 Challengers Finals. By placing second in this event, Fnatic qualified for the VCT Stage 2 Masters tournament in Reykjavik, Iceland. In Iceland, Fnatic finished second following a 0–3 loss against the North American side Sentinels. On 6 August 2021, MAGNUM extended their contract until 2024. Despite weaker performances in other tournaments, Fnatic qualified for 2021 Valorant Champions on circuit points, where they finished 5–8th following a 1–2 loss against KRÜ Esports.

Ahead of the 2022 season, Fnatic signed BraveAF to replace Doma. BraveAF was suspended from the roster on 30 March 2022 following a leaked conversation regarding the 2022 Russian invasion of Ukraine. BraveAF later stated that " We had a little chat before 24th of feb and I wrote her in the morning of 24th feb to know if she's alright.", stating that he is for peace. Fearoth joined the team on loan from Alliance as a replacement ahead of the 2022 Valorant Champions Tour Stage 2 Masters in Reykjavik. H1ber was loaned from KOI following a positive COVID-19 test for Derke. Fnatic finished 11–12th at the event following a 0–2 loss against the Japanese ZETA Division. On 10 May 2022, Fnatic signed Enzo (previously known as Fearoth), as a full-time member, as well as Alfajer to complete the roster. MAGNUM left the team on 9 June to join KOI. The new roster finished first at the EMEA Stage 2 Challengers after beating FunPlus Phoenix 3–0 in the finals, handing them a direct invite to 2022 Valorant Champions Tour: Stage 2 Masters tournament. Fnatic finished fourth following a 1–2 loss against FunPlus Phoenix.

On 21 September 2022, Fnatic was selected as a partner to compete in the Valorant Champions Tour EMEA. Following this announcement, Mistic and Enzo both announced free agency from the organisation and were placed on the bench.

On 4 March 2023, Fnatic narrowly beat LOUD 3-2 in the finals of LOCK//IN São Paulo, the opening event of the VCT 2023 season. This was the first international trophy for the Fnatic Valorant team, with only Chronicle having previously lifted the Masters 3 trophy in September 2021 for Gambit Esports.

Current roster

Former divisions

Clash Royale 
On 3 April 2018, Fnatic announced that it was entering and competing in the upcoming Clash Royale League. They finished 7th in the group stage.

In Clash Royale League Season 2, Fnatic finished 4th in the Group Stage of West Region, thereby failing to qualify for finals.

Heroes of the Storm 
On 9 October 2014, Fnatic expanded into Heroes of the Storm, announcing a temporary team for the BlizzCon Exhibition Tournament, featuring key players from the StarCraft II and League of Legends competitive scenes (Johan Lucchesi, Kim Hammar, Manuel Mildenberger, Cristian Lippa and Joaquim Fitas). After this event, there was a rotation of new players, notably Jonathan Gunnarsson, Simon Svensson, Thomas Cailleux, Alexandre Laignel or Lawrence Harper. The team won nearly every HOTS tournament in 2017, but the game slowly began to lose its popularity and player base. Fnatic disbanded its Heroes of the Storm division on 19 December 2018.

Smite 
On 8 November 2014, Fnatic signed its first Smite team, acquiring the roster of Exposed Secrets. The team made it to the semifinals of the Season 1 EU regional Championship but did not manage to qualify for the SMITE World Championship. On 23 December 2014 the team disbanded.

On 6 March 2015 Fnatic announced signing the roster of SK Gaming. The team competed in the Smite Pro League and finished 5th in the Summer Finals, winning $18,250.

For the Season 3 Spring Split, Fnatic announced the addition of BigManTingz and Jiffy to the team after Badgah and CaptainTwig left at the start of 2016. The team finished the season in 8th place with an 8–20 record.

The Fnatic SMITE team disbanded on 18 July 2016.

ShootMania Storm 
In November 2012, Fnatic announced that they picked up a ShootMania Storm team. The team recruited Kévin "Strenx" Baéza, a former member of their previous Quake team, as well as two new players, Maikel "LeKaiM" Peeters and Jean Pierre "JiePie" Janssen. The trio won numerous small cups, and the Shootmania Launch Party, where they won $30,000.  In December, Christoffer "Luxxiz" Losell joined the team after the departure of LeKaiM.

On 8 January 2014 Fnatic announced the departure of their ShootMania squad and the closure of their Shootmania division, stating a decline in quantity and quality of ShootMania tournaments as the main reason.

Real-time strategy games 
With DXRacer joining the list of sponsors, Fnatic decided to expand to Korea. On 19 March 2012 they announced that they would open a Fnatic Gaming House in Seoul. They became the first foreign team to establish a permanent training facility for players in Seoul.
Fnatic then acquired several talented players from the Korean StarCraft II scene. In January, "DeParture" and Warcraft legend "Moon", and "aLive" moved into the gaming house. They were coached by Hwanni, who also joined Fnatic that month. Later, OZ and Luvsic signed a contract with Fnatic. In 2012, Rain announced his retirement and left the team, followed by Byul, Ares and Moon. Only two players were left in Korea, forcing Fnatic to announce their closure of their gaming house in Seoul and the end of their contracts with aLive and OZ. Harstem was later promoted from the academy to the main roster, and the team picked up SaSe, another well known player in the scene.

PUBG Mobile 
On 18 October 2019, Fnatic entered the PUBG Mobile scene after signing the roster of Indian team XSpark. Following the acquisition, Fnatic announced plans to construct a gaming facility in India. On 28 November 2019, Fnatic underwent a roster change with Inyourdream being replaced by Ash along with Pratik "Aurum" Mehra being brought in as a coach. On 22 December 2019, the team won its first offline event at the PUBG Mobile All Stars in Hyderabad, India.

On 27 January 2020, Fnatic began training at a temporary boot camp in Mumbai.

On 24 May 2021, Fnatic disbanded their PUBG Mobile roster after the game was banned in India due to tensions between China and India. PUBG Mobile was released in India by the Chinese conglomerate Tencent, and the company was banned in India due to data privacy issues.

Tournament results

References

External links 

 

 
Companies established in 2004
Counter-Strike teams
Defunct and inactive fighting game player sponsors
Esports teams based in England
Heroes of the Storm teams
League of Legends European Championship teams
Smite (video game) teams
StarCraft teams
Dota teams
Quake teams
Defunct and inactive Overwatch teams
World of Warcraft teams
Defunct and inactive Hearthstone teams
Rocket League teams
Tom Clancy's Rainbow Six Siege teams
Valorant teams
British Internet groups